Thomas Tighe (1829–15 June 1914) was an Irish Home Rule League politician.

He was elected as Member of Parliament (MP) for Mayo at the 1874 general election but was shortly after unseated. At the resulting by-election, he failed to regain the seat.

He was High Sheriff of Mayo in 1879.

References

External links
 

1829 births
1914 deaths
High Sheriffs of Mayo
Home Rule League MPs
Members of the Parliament of the United Kingdom for County Mayo constituencies (1801–1922)
UK MPs 1874–1880